Al-Rukniyah Madrasa  is a 13th-century madrasah located in Damascus, Syria.

See also
Al-Adiliyah Madrasa
Az-Zahiriyah Library
Nur al-Din Madrasa

References

Religious buildings and structures completed in 1224
Mausoleums in Syria
Ayyubid architecture in Syria
Buildings and structures inside the walled city of Damascus
Madrasas in Damascus
13th-century establishments in the Ayyubid Sultanate